.500 may refer to:
.500 S&W Magnum, a revolver cartridge
.500 S&W Special, a revolver cartridge
.500 Wyoming Express, a revolver cartridge
.500 Linebaugh, a revolver cartridge
.500 Maximum, a revolver cartridge
.500 Bushwhacker, a revolver cartridge
.500 Nitro Express, a big-game rifle cartridge
.500 Jeffery, a big-game rifle cartridge
.500 Whisper, a subsonic rifle cartridge
.500 Black Powder Express, a black powder rifle cartridge
.500, an even winning percentage in sports, where a team or player has won the same number of games as they have lost